Julio Aróstegui Sánchez (1939–2013) was a Spanish historian. Professor at the Complutense University of Madrid (UCM), some of his research lines included the study of political violence in Modern Spanish history, Carlism, the Spanish Transition, the Spanish Civil War, the history of the workers' movement and collective memory. His scholar production also intertwined with the theoretical problems of history and the methodology of research.

Biography 
Born on 24 July 1939 in Granada, Aróstegui studied at the Colegio Mayor Isabel la Católica, thanks to a scholarship. He took higher studies at the University of Granada and in Madrid. He earned a chair as professor of secondary education in a high school in Vitoria in 1967. He worked for years attached to the Consejo Superior de Investigaciones Científicas (CSIC).

He earned a Chair of History at the Complutense University of Madrid in 1984. Retired, he served as emeritus professor between 2009 and 2012.

He died in Madrid on 28 January 2013.

Works 

 
 
 
  (reedition)

References 
Citations

Bibliography
 
 
 
 
 
 
 
 
 
 
 

1939 births
2013 deaths
Academic staff of the Complutense University of Madrid
Historians of Spain
Historians of the Spanish transition to democracy
Historians of the Spanish Civil War
University of Granada alumni
People from Granada
Historians of carlism
Historians of the labour movement in Spain